Oscar Frederick Hedlund (born in Woburn, Massachusetts August 26, 1887 and died in Cambridge, Massachusetts December 8, 1971) was an American track and field athlete who competed in the 1912 Summer Olympics.

In 1912 he participated in the final of the 1500 metres competition.  He finished second in his qualifying heat.  His result in the final is not exactly known (listed as "also competed") but he finished the race in place nine to fourteen.

References

External links
list of American athletes

1887 births
1971 deaths
American male middle-distance runners
Olympic track and field athletes of the United States
Athletes (track and field) at the 1912 Summer Olympics
American people of Swedish descent